Pari (also Romanized as Parī) is a village in Oryad Rural District of the Central District of Mahneshan County, Zanjan province, Iran. At the 2006 National Census, its population was 777 in 177 households. The following census in 2011 counted 933 people in 189 households. The latest census in 2016 showed a population of 855 people in 247 households; it was the largest village in its rural district.

References 

Mahneshan County

Populated places in Zanjan Province

Populated places in Mahneshan County